The term Maoist rebel could refer to members of the following parties:

Unified Communist Party of Nepal (Maoist)
Communist Party of India (Maoist)
New People's Army